Elections were held in Frontenac County, Ontario on October 22, 2018 in conjunction with municipal elections across the province.

Frontenac County Council
Frontenac County Council consists of the mayors of each of the four constituent municipalities plus an additional councillor from each municipality.

Central Frontenac

Frontenac Islands

North Frontenac

South Frontenac

Source:

References

Frontenac
Frontenac County